Dmitry Belyayev may refer to:
Dmitry Belyayev (zoologist) (1917–1985), Russian zoologist
Dmitry Belyaev (artist) (1921–2007), Russian painter